The men's 400 metres hurdles was an event at the 1992 Summer Olympics in Barcelona, Spain. It was held from 3 to 6 August at the Estadi Olímpic Lluís Companys. There were 47 competitors from 35 nations. The maximum number of athletes per nation had been set at 3 since the 1930 Olympic Congress. The event was won by Kevin Young of the United States, the nation's third consecutive and 15th overall victory in the event. Winthrop Graham earned Jamaica's first men's 400 metres hurdles medal with his silver. Kriss Akabusi earned bronze, putting Great Britain on the podium in the event for the first time since 1980. The three medalists had finished in the same order in 1988, just outside of the medals that year in fourth through sixth places.

Background

This was the 20th time the event was held. It had been introduced along with the men's 200 metres hurdles in 1900, with the 200 being dropped after 1904 and the 400 being held through 1908 before being left off the 1912 programme. However, when the Olympics returned in 1920 after World War I, the men's 400 metres hurdles was back and would continue to be contested at every Games thereafter.

Four of the eight finalists from the 1988 Games returned: silver medalist Amadou Dia Ba of Senegal, fourth-place finisher Kevin Young of the United States, fifth-place finisher Winthrop Graham of Jamaica, and sixth-place finisher Kriss Akabusi of Great Britain. Two of the great long hurdlers, American Edwin Moses and West German Harald Schmid, had retired. The reigning world champion, and favorite in Barcelona, was Samuel Matete of Zambia. Graham and Akabusi had finished behind Matete at the world championships and were also strong contenders.

The Central African Republic, Costa Rica, Guam, Guinea, Israel, Papua New Guina, Thailand, and Tonga each made their debut in the event; some former Soviet republics competed as the Unified Team. The United States made its 19th appearance, most of any nation, having missed only the boycotted 1980 Games.

Summary

Running in lane 4, Kevin Young appeared to have the slowest reaction to the gun of the field. To his inside, Graham was the first over the first hurdle. Using a left leg lead, 13 strides to the second hurdle, Young had pulled to just slightly behind Graham. Between the next two hurdles he ran 12 strides, alternating to the right leg lead over the fourth hurdle. Over the fifth hurdle he had made up the stagger on Kriss Akabusi to his outside. Relative to the hurdles, he had clearly passed Graham with the rest of the field clearly a full stride or more behind. Running 13 strides the rest of the way, he passed the rest of the competitors to his outside between the next two hurdles. A one stride lead over Graham at the eight hurdle became two by the ninth. Young was still powerful as Graham was struggling. In the battle for bronze, Stéphane Diagana had a slight lead over Akabusi over the eighth hurdle, but Akabusi clearly broke away between eight and nine, which Diagana struggled to clear. Young tried to maintain his power into the final hurdle though he came up a little short, catching the face of the hurdle with his lead leg heel, riding the hurdle to the ground. He maintained his powerful stride to the finish. Realizing he had the clear victory, Young raised his right arm in celebration 10 meters before the finish, slowing his last four strides. Still, Young crossed the finish line with a new world record, taking almost a quarter of a second out of Edwin Moses' 9-year-old record. Graham held on for second, as Akabusi was unable to make up the gap with Diagana unable to recover the distance he had lost to Akabusi.

Competition format

The competition used the three-round format used every Games since 1908 (except the four-round competition in 1952): quarterfinals, semifinals, and a final. Ten sets of hurdles were set on the course. The hurdles were 3 feet (91.5 centimetres) tall and were placed 35 metres apart beginning 45 metres from the starting line, resulting in a 40 metres home stretch after the last hurdle. The 400 metres track was standard.

There were 7 quarterfinal heats with 7 athletes each (before two withdrawals left one heat with only 5). The top 2 men in each quarterfinal advanced to the semifinals along with the next fastest 2 overall. The 16 semifinalists were divided into 2 semifinals of 8 athletes each, with the top 4 in each semifinal advancing to the 8-man final.

Records

These were the standing world and Olympic records (in seconds) prior to the 1992 Summer Olympics.

In the final Kevin Young set a new world record with 46.78.

Schedule

All times are Central European Summer Time (UTC+2)

Results

Quarterfinals

Quarterfinal 1

Quarterfinal 2

Quarterfinal 3

Quarterfinal 4

Quarterfinal 5

Quarterfinal 6

Quarterfinal 7

Semifinals

Semifinal 1

Semifinal 2

Final

The final was held on August 6, 1992.

Results summary

See also
 1990 Men's European Championships 400m Hurdles (Split)
 1991 Men's World Championships 400m Hurdles (Tokyo)
 1993 Men's World Championships 400m Hurdles (Stuttgart)
 1994 Men's European Championships 400m Hurdles (Helsinki)

References

External links
 Official Report
 Results

H
400 metres hurdles at the Olympics
Men's events at the 1992 Summer Olympics